The Edge Band is a pop rock band from Nepal, formed in 1998 by youths of Pokhara. The first album was  released in 2000. Over time, the band members left the group except Jeewan Gurung, the lead singer. In 2006 Vibes with Vajra was released as the second album, which gained popularity and established the band in the Nepali music industry. There are four albums released till date.

The group also plays in live concerts and festivals nationally and internationally. They also perform for charities such as the one in Pokhara for establishment of a zoo.

International live concerts
Japan, 2019 
 Australia, 2018, 2020
 United States of America, 2017
UAE, 2017

Members 

Founding members
Binaya Gurung
Roshan Gurung
Sunil Gubaju
Bikash Singh
Asok Sundas
Kristina Shrestha
Jeewan Gurung

Other members

Sanjeeb BK
 Albin Pariyar 
Ganesh Rai
Bishnu Gurung
 Som
 Rockey
Basanta
Abhinish Goinjihar

Albums
Mero asu 2000
Vibes and Vajra 2006 
Alag 2013
Gantabya 2017

Awards and Nomination
Best lyric award for  the song “Dukha Diyera” in Pokhara Music Awards.
 Nominated for best the Rock Vocal Performance in 9th Tuborg Image Awards.
 Best Pop Band- Kalika Awards

References

External links
official youtube channel

Edge Band, The
Edge Band, The
Edge Band, The
Edge Band, The